Maharaja Sir Harendra Kishore Singh was the last ruler of Bettiah Raj. He was born in 1854 and succeeded his father, the Rajendra Kishore Singh Bahadur, in 1883. In 1884 received the title of Maharaja Bahadur as a personal distinction and a Khilat and a sanad from the hands of the Lieutenant Governor of Bengal, Augustus Rivers Thompson. He was created a Knight Commander of the Most Eminent Order of the Indian Empire on 1 March 1889. He was appointed a member of the Legislative Council of Bengal in January 1891. He was also a member of The Asiatic Society

References

Hindu monarchs
19th-century Indian monarchs
Indian maharajas
1854 births
1893 deaths
Indian knights
Knights Commander of the Order of the Indian Empire
History of Bihar
Bengal Presidency
People from Bihar